Witness Protection is a 1999 American crime drama television film directed by Richard Pearce and starring Tom Sizemore, Mary Elizabeth Mastrantonio, Forest Whitaker, Shawn Hatosy, and Skye McCole Bartusiak. The teleplay by Daniel Therriault is based on a 1996 New York Times Magazine article entitled "The Invisible Family" by Robert Sabbag. It was broadcast by HBO on December 11, 1999.

Plot synopsis
South Boston career criminal Bobby "Bats" Batton, facing execution by his partner in crime, Theo Cruise, a Charlestown mobster, whom the FBI wants behind bars for a double murder, is offered a deal by the feds: immunity from prosecution for several serious crimes in exchange for testimony against Cruise, after which he and his family will join the Federal Witness Protection Program.

Batton accepts the offer, and he, his wife Cindy, his Harvard-bound son Sean, and young daughter Suzie spend five days with U.S. Marshal Steve Beck, who coaches them in their new identities in preparation for their relocation to Seattle.

Trying to cope without money, friends, relatives, pets, possessions, or any semblance of a past existence proves to be more difficult than any of them anticipated. When the family slowly begins to disintegrate under the weight of recriminations and frustration, Bobby wonders if his freedom is worth the sacrifices his loved ones have been forced to make.

Principal cast
 Tom Sizemore as Bobby "Bats" Batton
 Mary Elizabeth Mastrantonio as Cindy Batton
 Forest Whitaker as U.S. Marshal Steve Beck
 Shawn Hatosy as Sean Batton
 Skye McCole Bartusiak as Suzie Batton
 William Sadler as U.S. Attorney Sharp
 Jim Metzler as U.S. Marshal Jim Cutler
 Daniel Zacapa as U.S. Marshal David Ramirez
 Greg Pitts as U.S. Marshal Duffy
 Randy Thompson as U.S. Marshal #1
 Byron Minns as U.S. Marshal #2
 Harrison Young as Mr. O'Connor, Cindy's father
 Joanna Merlin as Mrs. O'Connor, Cindy's mother
 Leon Russom as Reedy
 Greg Lipari as Hit Man
 Richard Portnow as Nikos "The Greek" Stephanos (uncredited)

Production
The film was inspired by Robert Sabbag's article "The Invisible Family", the cover story of the February 11, 1996 issue of The New York Times Magazine. According to Sabbag, "I realized that this was going to be a movie when 11 producers called me the day after it was published."

Filming took place in Los Angeles. The Witness Security Safe Site and Orientation Center, the real-life secret facility in the Washington, D.C., area used by the Witness Protection Program, was re-created on a sound stage at Raleigh Studios.

Critical reception
Caren Weiner Campbell of Entertainment Weekly rated the DVD release a B and added, "With its moody Sopranos vibe, this modest made-for-cable drama begins gracefully but bogs down a bit during the family's orientation, during which Whitaker, as the feds' liaison, gives a performance so subdued he almost seems to be sleepwalking."

Nominations
Golden Globe Award for Best Miniseries or Television Film
Golden Globe Award for Best Actor – Miniseries or Television Film (Tom Sizemore)
Primetime Emmy Award for Outstanding Cinematography for a Miniseries, Movie, or Dramatic Special

References

External links
 

1999 films
1999 crime drama films
1990s American films
1990s English-language films
American crime drama films
American drama television films
Crime television films
Films about families
Films about organized crime in the United States
Films about witness protection
Films based on newspaper and magazine articles
Films directed by Richard Pearce
Films scored by Cliff Eidelman
Films set in Boston
Films set in Seattle
Films shot in Los Angeles
HBO Films films
United States Marshals Service in fiction